The Pindus (also Pindos or Pindhos; ;) is a mountain range located in Northern Greece and Southern Albania. It is roughly 160 km (100 miles) long, with a maximum elevation of 2,637 metres (8652') (Mount Smolikas). Because it runs along the border of Thessaly and Epirus, the Pindus range is known colloquially as the spine of Greece. The mountain range stretches from near the Greek-Albanian border in southern Albania, entering the Epirus and Macedonia regions in northern Greece down to the north of the Peloponnese. Geologically it is an extension of the Dinaric Alps, which dominate the western region of the Balkan Peninsula.

History of the name 
Historically, the name Pindos refers to the mountainous territory that separates the greater Epirus region from the regions of Macedonia and Thessaly.

According to John Tzetzes (a 12th-century Byzantine writer), the Pindos range was then called Metzovon.

By the eighteenth century, there had been identification of the name Metsovo with the Pindos mountain range (in a French encyclopedia of 1756). BY 1825, the traveller John Cam Hobhouse was writing that "…the latter mountains, now known by the name of Metzovo, can be no other than Pindus itself…" while a patriarchal document of 1818 states: "Because the high mountain of Pindos in Epirus, that is commonly called Messovon...". The word Pindos was used more in literary sources, while the folk name for the mountain range from the Middle Ages up to the 19th century was either "Metsovo" or "the mountains of Metsovo". Most probably this name was not meant to indicate the whole range as it is meant today, but only its central part between the area of Aspropotamos and the springs of the Aoös River.  This part coincides with the mountainous region which the ancient Greeks used to call Pindos.

Major mountains 
The most notable mountains in the range are Mount Grammos, Mount Smolikas, Mount Vasilitsa, Tymfi or Gamila, Lakmos or Peristeri, the Athamanika or Tzoumerka mountains, and the Agrafa mountains. Some mountains in Southern Greece are also considered part of the extended Pindus range. Its highest peak is on Mount Smolikas at an altitude of 2,637 meters.

Population 
There are many villages in the Pindus, one of them being Samarina, which boasts one of the highest elevations in Greece. The area had a traditional pastoral economy in which sheep were raised by shepherds who were ethnically Sarakatsani and Aromanian. Many of the villages such as Perivoli and Smixi include communities of Aromanians (Vlachs), originally shepherds and farmers. In the last decades, a number of villages, such as Metsovo, developed into tourist resorts with ski facilities.

Transportation 
The Egnatia Odos highway serves the region and connects it with the rest of Greece.

Sightseeing 
Besides the imposing mountainous terrain of the range, two significant gorges in Europe are located in the area: the Vikos Gorge and the Aoos Gorge. Together with the mountain valley of Valia Kalda they have been declared protected regions and constitute the National Park of Northern Pindos. Furthermore, many mountain settlements with long history and unique architecture are located throughout the range.

Nature and wildlife 

The Pindus region covers a wide range of elevations and habitats, from deep canyons to steep mountains. The wide range in altitude results in two major forest zones:
 A conifer zone, where trees such as a subspecies of Austrian Pine and the endemic Greek fir, characterise the highest elevations, with juniper woodlands dominating near the timberline.
 A mixed broadleaf forest zone dominates the valleys and canyons of the middle and lower elevations.

Large breeding colonies of herons, spoonbills, egrets, and pelicans fish the waters of the mountain lakes of the Pindus. This is one of the few areas in Europe where the rare Dalmatian pelican can be found. Wolves, jackals, and bears are found in the forests.

Ecology 

The forests of this region have faced many threats over the course of human history, including overgrazing, agriculture, and deforestation. The greatest threats now come from the development of mountain tourism and ski resorts. Because of the instability of the soil on steep mountains, road-building and clear-cutting operations have led to dangerous landslides and the collapse of mountain slopes. Mining for bauxite, overgrazing, and over-collection of plants are also threatening the great biodiversity of this ecoregion.

National Parks 
In the Greek section of the Pindus mountains there are two national parks.

Vikos-Aoos National Park 

The Vikos-Aoos National Park is south of the town of Konitsa, in the west part of Zagori region. It includes Mount Tymfi, the Vikos Gorge and the Aoos Gorge. It was created in 1973.

Pindus National Park

The Pindus National Park (also known as Valia Kalda) is in a remote area in the north east of the Pindus mountains, north of the town of Metsovo and south of Perivoli. The park of some 7,000 hectares was established in 1966. There are forests of black pine and beech, and in the higher parts, Bosnian Pine (Pinus leucodermis). The park is a refuge for bears, wild cats, and lynxes.

The National Park was selected as main motif for two high value euro collectors' coins: the €10 Greek Birds and Flowers and Black Pine Trees commemorative coins, minted in 2007. On the obverse of the latter there is a panoramic view of the common black pine trees that are prevalent in the park.

See also 
 Agrafa
 Battle of Pindus
 Mount Smolikas

References

Sources 
 N. Hammond, Epirus, vol. A΄, transl. Athanasiou Giagka, publ. Epirotiki Vivliothiki, Athens 1971, pp. 12–13.
 F. Dasoulas, “Pindos, oi geografikes kai istorikes diastaseis enos onomatos” [Pindos, the geographical and historic dimensions of a name], Epirotiko Imerologio 31(2012), pp. 189–254
 K. Tsipiras, Oreini Ellada [Mountainous Greece], publ. Kedros S.A., 2003, pp. 14–61 
 N. Kosmas, “Oi diodoi tis Pindou” [The passages of Pindos], Epirotiki Estia 4 (1955), pp. 14–20. 
 N. Pihtos, H aisthitiki tis Pindou [The aesthetics of Pindos], publ. City of Metsovo, Ioannina 1988.
 B. Nitsiakos, Oi oreines koinotites tis voreias Pindou. Ston apoiho tis makras diarkeias [The mountainous settlements of Northern Pindos. Long term echoes], publ. Plethron, Athens 1995.

Further reading 
Salmon, T. (2006), The Mountains of Greece: The Pindos Mountains, Cicerone Press,

External links 

 Greek Mountain Flora
 Pindus Mountains terrain map by Geopsis (includes Tzoumerka, Peristeri, Aspropotamos, Triggia, Koziakas)

 
Mountain ranges of Albania
Mountain ranges of Greece
Physiographic sections
Landforms of Epirus (region)
Landforms of Central Greece
Landforms of Thessaly
Landforms of Western Macedonia